Bùi Thị Bích Phương (born 30 September 1989, in Quang Ninh), better known as Bích Phương is a Vietnamese pop music singer. She entered the entertainment industry as a contestant of Season 3 of Vietnam Idol in 2010, and has since been  established as one of Vietnam's most popular singers of the 2010s.

Career

2008-2010: Vietnam Idol
As a participant of the second season of Vietnam Idol, she was cut at the top 40. She returned for the third season, having more success but being cut at the top 7 after performing "From Sarah with Love".

2011–13: Success with "Chỉ là em giấu đi" 
In 2011, Bích Phương debuted with the song "Có khi nào rời xa" (translation, there will be times we'll be far apart), written by Tien Cookie, establishing her reputation as strong ballad singer. She would follow up with "Thánh nữ nhạc sầu".

In 2013, she would release her first full album Chỉ là em giấu đi, which included hit songs "Em sẽ quên", Vẫn, "Có khi nào rời xa", "Có lẽ em", and "Em muốn". Bích Phương and her album would gain significant recognition. The album was recognized as the album with the most weeks on top of the charts at the 2013 Zing Music Awards. Also, the song "Em muốn" received top prizes at the YAN Vpop 20 Awards 2013, with Bích Phương also named "Top 20 Singers" shortlist and "Breakout Female Singer of the Year".

2014–17: genre changes with "Mình yêu nhau đi", "Gửi anh xa nhớ" and "Bao giờ lấy chồng" 
In 2014, Bích Phương began departing from the sad songs she was most known for and recorded up-tempo pop music. Starting  "Mình yêu nhau đi" composed by Tiên Cookie. In that year, she received three awards out of seven nominations at the 2014 Zing Music Awards, the most for any artist that year. She would release two EPs Điều chưa từng nói in 2014 and Rằng em mãi ở bên in 2015.

In 2016, the song "Gửi anh xa nhớ" was well received and garnered awards for Bích Phương during the 2016 Zing Music Awards and We Choice Awards 2016. She would follow up in 2017 with "Bao giờ lấy chồng", a song about the difficulties of being interrogated for being single on trips home for Tet.  Later that year, she would join fellow Vietnam Idol Season 3 alum Văn Mai Hương as a judge Vietnam Idol Kids 2017. In July of that year, she would release her second full album Nói thương nhau thì đừng làm trái tim em đau.

2018–19: mainstream recognition, Dramatic, "Bùa yêu" and "Đi đu đưa đi" 
In 2018, Bích Phương began a foray into the indie pop  with the songs "Bùa yêu" Chạy ngay đi with Sơn Tùng M-TP. In October of that year, she released the album  Dramatic with the single "Drama Queen". In 11 November, she began promoting "Chị ngả em nâng" from the album Dramatic. At the end of the year, she worked with Tết Nguyên Đán and a popular soda brand to release "Chuyện cũ bỏ qua", with the associated music video receiving over 100 million streams.

During the Làn Sóng Xanh 2018 ceremony, Bích Phương and her song "Bùa yêu" received seven award nominations. "Bùa yêu" would bring  Bích Phương two awards out of four nominations during Keeng Young Awards 2018, Music Video of the year at the Giải thưởng Âm nhạc Cống hiến 2019, and pushed her YouTube account to be the first to reach a million subscribers among Vietnam's female soloists.

Discography

Albums

Extended plays

Singles

As lead artist

Promotional singles

Other charted songs

Awards and nominations

Asia Artist Awards

Devotion Music Awards 
The award is considered as an "Grammy Award" in Vietnamese music.

Gala Vietnam Top Hits

Green Wave Music Awards 
Green Wave  Music Awards is one of the oldest and most prestigious annual music awards in the Vietnamese music industry. It was started in 1997 with the governing body being the 99.9 MHz FM radio station of the Voice of the People of Ho Chi Minh City.

Metub WebTVAsia Awards

Vlive Awards

YanVpop20 Awards

Zing Music Awards

References 

Living people
Vietnam Idol
21st-century Vietnamese women singers
1989 births